William Pymme (fl. mid 14th-century) was a landowner in Edmonton, now in London, a member of the Pymme family who had been granted land by Edward II in the 14th century.

In 1327, he built the original Pymmes House on the north side of Watery Lane in Edmonton, now known as Silver Street. The house was subsequently occupied by a number of notable individuals including Thomas Wilson (1524–1581), William Cecil, 1st Baron Burghley (1520–1598), and Robert Cecil, 1st Earl of Salisbury (c. 1563 – 1612). It was significantly remodelled more than once but demolished after a fire in 1940. The house was sited in what is now Pymmes Park. The Pymmes Brook, named after the family, runs through the park.

In 1362 he entered into certain transactions relating to land with Adam Fraunceys.

References

External links 

English landowners
14th-century English people
Year of birth missing
Year of death missing